Events in the year 1857 in Portugal.

Incumbents
Monarch: Peter V
Prime Minister: Nuno José Severo de Mendoça Rolim de Moura Barreto, 1st Duke of Loulé

Events

Arts and entertainment

Sports

Births

 6 March – Manuel Maria Coelho, military officer and politician (died 1943)
5 May – António Teixeira de Sousa, medical doctor and politician (d. 1917).

Deaths

References

 
1850s in Portugal
Portugal
Years of the 19th century in Portugal
Portugal